Eldrick Celaire (born 21 November 1978) is an Aruban football player. He appeared for the Aruba national team twice in 2004.

National team statistics

References

1978 births
Living people
Aruban footballers
Association football defenders
SV Dakota players
SV Britannia players
Aruba international footballers